|}

This is a list of electoral district results of the 1986 Western Australian election.

Results by Electoral district

Albany

Armadale

Ascot

Avon

Balcatta

Balga

Bunbury

Canning

Clontarf

Cockburn

Collie

Cottesloe

Dale

Darling Range

East Melville

Esperance-Dundas

Floreat

Fremantle

Gascoyne

Geraldton 

Note: the Liberal candidate for Geraldton, Marjorie Tubby, was the wife of the sitting member for Greenough, Reg Tubby.

Gosnells

Greenough

Helena

Joondalup

Kalamunda

Kalgoorlie

Karrinyup

Katanning-Roe

Kimberley

Mandurah

Maylands

Melville

Merredin

Mitchell

Moore

Morley-Swan

Mount Lawley

Mount Marshall

Mundaring

Murchison-Eyre

Murdoch

Murray-Wellington

Narrogin

Nedlands

Nollamara

Perth

Pilbara

Rockingham

Scarborough

South Perth

Stirling

Subiaco

Vasse

Victoria Park

Warren

Welshpool

Whitford

See also 

 Results of the Western Australian state election, 1986 (Legislative Council)
 1986 Western Australian state election
 Candidates of the Western Australian state election, 1986
 Members of the Western Australian Legislative Assembly, 1986–1989

References 

Results of Western Australian elections
1986 elections in Australia